Apha huabeiana is a moth in the family Eupterotidae. It was described by Yang in 1978. It is found in China.

References

Moths described in 1978
Eupterotinae